The Andrew W. Mellon Foundation of New York City in the United States, simply known as Mellon Foundation, is a private foundation with five core areas of interest, and endowed with wealth accumulated by Andrew Mellon of the Mellon family of Pittsburgh, Pennsylvania. It is the product of the 1969 merger of the Avalon Foundation and the Old Dominion Foundation. These foundations had been set up separately by Ailsa Mellon Bruce and Paul Mellon, the children of Andrew Mellon.

The foundation is housed in New York City in the expanded former offices of the Bollingen Foundation, another educational philanthropy once supported by Paul Mellon. Poet and scholar Elizabeth Alexander is the foundation's current president. Her predecessors have included Earl Lewis, Don Randel, William G. Bowen, John Edward Sawyer and Nathan Pusey. In 2004, the foundation was awarded the National Medal of Arts.

Core areas of interest
 Higher education, including the humanities, libraries, and scholarly communication and information technology
 Museums and art conservation
 Performing arts
 Conservation and the environment

Research group
Mellon has a small research group that has investigated doctoral education, collegiate admissions, independent research libraries, charitable nonprofits, scholarly communications, and other issues  to ensure that the foundation's grants would be well-informed and more effective. Some of the recent publications of this effect include Equity and Excellence in American Higher Education, Reclaiming the Game: College Sports and Educational Values, JSTOR: A History, The Game of Life: College Sports and Educational Values, and The Shape of the River.

Mellon's endowment has fluctuated in the range of $5–6 billion in recent years, and its annual grantmaking has been on the order of $300 million.

Projects & initiatives
Aluka
Artstor
JSTOR
Open Library of Humanities
The Monuments Project
The Maniobra Initiative (The work of one's hands initiative)
Creatives Rebuild New York

See also
List of wealthiest charitable foundations

References

External links
 The Andrew W. Mellon Foundation official site
 Mellon Program in Scholarly Communication
 Mellon Program in Museums and Art Conservation
 Mellon Program in Research in Information Technology
 Mellon Mays Undergraduate Fellowships
 The UCL Mellon Program
 Finding aid to the A.W. Mellon Educational and Charitable Trust Records at the Archives Service Center, University of Pittsburgh

 
1969 establishments in New York City
Organizations established in 1969
Conservation and restoration organizations
United States National Medal of Arts recipients
Foundations based in the United States